Kpilo is a community in Kumbungu District in the Northern Region of Ghana. It is a small community
with nucleated settlement. The community is less populated with most of its inhabitants being farmers.

See also

References 

Communities in Ghana
Populated places in Kumbungu District